Cassa di Risparmio di Biella (Caribiella) was an Italian regional bank and charity organization, based in Biella, Piedmont. The bank section was merged with Cassa di Risparmio di Vercelli in 1994, while the charity organization, Fondazione Cassa di Risparmio di Biella, still contributes the revenue to Biella and surrounding areas.

Bank
1856 Cassa di Risparmio di Biella e Circondario was formed by Giovanni Pietro Losana
1970s issues Miniassegno 
1992 Due to Legge Amato, Cassa di Risparmio di Biella S.p.A. and Fondazione Cassa di Risparmio di Biella was formed to separate the function of bank and non-profit organization 
1994 Cassa di Risparmio di Biella merged with Cassa di Risparmio di Vercelli to form Cassa di Risparmio di Biella e Vercelli

Bank Foundation
The foundation sponsored the local literature award Premio Biella Letteratura e Industria. It owned a minority ownership in Cassa Depositi e Prestiti (0.10%), as well as Biella-Cerrione Airport (Società Aeroporto Cerrione, 27.75%). As of 31 December 2014, the foundation had a shareholders equity of €221,611,969.

See also
other bank of the provincial capital of Piedmont
 Cassa di Risparmio di Asti
 Cassa di Risparmio di Alessandria, now part of Banca Popolare di Milano
 Cassa di Risparmio di Cuneo, now part of UBI Banca
 Cassa di Risparmio di Torino, now part of UniCredit

References

External links
 Fondazione Cassa di Risparmio di Biella

Banks established in 1856
1856 establishments in the Kingdom of Sardinia
Banks disestablished in 1994
Italian companies disestablished in 1994
Defunct banks of Italy
Companies based in Biella
Italian companies established in 1856